1969 college football season may refer to:

 1969 NCAA University Division football season
 1969 NCAA College Division football season
 1969 NAIA football season